The 1935 Chicago Cardinals season was their 16th in the league. The team improved on their previous output of 5–6, winning six games. They failed to qualify for the playoffs for the 10th consecutive season.

Schedule

Standings

References

1935
Chicago Cardinals
Chicago